Anton thor Helle ( in Tallinn –  in Jüri; also Anton Thorhelle, Anton torHelle, Anton thorHelle or Anthonij Torhelle) was the translator of the first Bible in Estonian in 1739, and the first Estonian grammar. The New Testament was a North Estonian revision of the 1648 version by Johannes Gutslaff (died 1657), the author of Observationes Grammaticae circa linguam Esthonicam, and Helle's version was revised many times, including by C. Malm in 1896.

References

External links
 Book cover of the Bible

Translators of the Bible into Estonian
1683 births
1743 deaths
Estonian language
Linguists from Estonia
People from Tallinn
18th-century Estonian people
18th-century translators
18th-century linguists
Estonian male writers
Writers from Tallinn